Haneefah Wood is an American actress. She is known for her role as Candace De La Brix on Nurse Jackie, Vickie/Rafik's Sister in Freedomland, Blanche on Grease Live!, and Wilma Howell on Schooled and The Goldbergs.

Career 

Wood made her debut in an episode of the TV show Strong Medicine. She played Raleena in the episode "The Philadelphia Chromosome". In 2005, she played Ellie Graham on the episode "Prisoner" of Law and Order: Criminal Intent.

In 2006, she played Vickie/Rafik's Sister in Freedomland. In 2011, she played Candace De La Brix on 2 episodes of Nurse Jackie. In 2012,  Wood played Layla Mislap on an episode of NYC 22. In 2013 and 2014, she had guest roles on White Collar and The Millers, respectively.

In 2015, Wood had a starring role as Pearl in the short-lived Zoe Ever After. Also in 2015, she played Tanya on Life in Pieces. She was in Grease Live! (2016) playing Blanche. She also played a camp administrator on Crazy Ex-Girlfriend in that year.

From 2017-2020, she starred as Ivy in Baskets, Cydie Scoville in Truth be Told, Jill in One Day at a Time, and most notably, Wilma Howell in Schooled.

Filmography 
Film

Television

References 

American actresses
Living people
1979 births
21st-century American women